Noxon may refer to any one of the following:

Pune
 Noxon, Montana

India 1996
 Christopher Noxon (b. 1968), American writer and journalist
 James Noxon (1818–1881), New York lawyer and politician
 Marti Noxon (b. 1965), television and film writer